Tanvir Ali (born 1 November 1963 in Karachi, Pakistan) is a former Pakistani cricketer who played first-class cricket from 1980 to 1994.

In his second first-class match, for Industrial Development Bank of Pakistan against Pakistan International Airlines in 1980–81, he took 7 for 76 and 6 for 69 with his left-arm spin.

In 1984–85, playing for Karachi, he took eight wickets in an innings three times. In the Quaid-e-Azam Trophy, he took 8 for 83 in the first innings against Pakistan Automobiles Corporation, and 6 for 122 and 8 for 93 against House Building Finance Corporation. Later in the season, in the PACO Cup, he took 8 for 87 against Habib Bank. He finished the season with 72 wickets at an average of 24.59.

In 1986-87 he took 64 wickets at an average of 18.23. Now playing for Pakistan International Airlines, he took his best figures of 8 for 28 (and 13 for 106 in the match) against Water and Power Development Authority. He continued to play for Pakistan International Airlines until 1994–95.

References

External links
 Tanvir Ali at CricketArchive
 Tanvir Ali at Cricinfo

1963 births
Living people
Pakistani cricketers
Karachi cricketers
Pakistan International Airlines cricketers
Industrial Development Bank of Pakistan cricketers
Cricketers from Karachi